Kim Jong-hun may refer to:
Kim Jong-hoon (politician, born 1952) (김종훈) (born 1952), South Korean politician
Jeong H. Kim (김종훈) (born 1960), Korean-American entrepreneur
Kim Jong-hoon (politician, born 1964) (김종훈) South Korean politician
Kim Jong-hoon (footballer) (김종훈) (born 1980), South Korean football player
Kim Jong-hun (footballer) (김정훈), North Korean football player
Kim Jong-hoon (actor) (born 1992), South Korean actor

See also
Kim Jeong-hun (disambiguation) (김정훈)